Astra 19.2°E is the name for the group of Astra communications satellites co-located at the 19.2°East orbital position in the Clarke Belt that are owned and operated by  SES based in Betzdorf, Luxembourg.

Astra 19.2°E used to be commonly known as Astra 1, as it was the first orbital position used by Astra and the craft positioned there all have the Astra 1x name, but this was changed by SES to Astra 19.2°E in 2008, to avoid confusion with other Astra orbital positions that now include Astra 1x craft originally positioned at 19.2°East.

The Astra satellites at 19.2°East provide for services downlinking in the 10.70 GHz-12.70 GHz range of the Ku band.

Astra 19.2°E is one of the major TV satellite positions serving Europe, transmitting over 1,150 TV, radio and interactive channels to more than 93 million direct-to-home (DTH) and cable homes in 35 countries (the other major satellite positions being at 13° East, 28.2° East, 23.5° East, and 5° East).

There are more than 40 high definition television (HDTV) channels broadcast by the satellites at 19.2°E, using five HDTV platforms. SES was instrumental in introducing satellite HDTV broadcasting in Europe, using the Astra 19.2°E satellites, and helped establish the HD ready specifications for TVs to view HDTV broadcasts. A subsidiary of SES, HD+ operates the HD+ free-to-view platform of German channels from Astra 19.2°E.

Astra 19.2°E was one of the last satellite position to carry numerous analogue channels, until 30 April 2012 when the switch-off of German analogue broadcasts was completed. It is also the only position to have carried radio stations in the proprietary Astra Digital Radio format, although that technology was superseded by DVB-S radio as the analogue transponders that carried the service switched to digital.

Satellites in use

Current
 Astra 1KR (launched 2006)
 Astra 1L (launched 2007)
 Astra 1M (launched 2008)
 Astra 1N (launched 2011)

Previous
 Astra 1A (launched 1988, retired)
 Astra 1B (launched 1991, retired)
 Astra 1C (launched 1993, retired)
 Astra 1D (launched 1994, retired)
 Astra 1E (launched 1995, retired)
 Astra 1F (launched 1996, retired)
 Astra 1G (launched 1997)
 Astra 1H (launched 1999)
 Astra 2B (launched 2000)
 Astra 2C (launched 2001)

Market
The satellites at the Astra 19.2°E position primarily provide digital TV, digital radio and multimedia services to Europe and North Africa, principally to Algeria, Austria, Belgium, France, Germany, Morocco, the Netherlands, Poland, Spain, Switzerland, and Tunisia.

Astra 19.2°E provides both free-to-air and a number of pay-TV services in networks such as ARD Digital, ArenaSat, CanalDigitaal, CanalSat, ORF Digital, Sky Germany, ProSieben, Movistar+, Sat.1, UPC Direct, and ZDF, and is the market leader for DTH and communal dish reception in Austria, Belgium, France, Germany, the Netherlands, Spain and Switzerland.

The relatively close proximity of Astra 19.2°E to one of SES' other orbital positions, Astra 23.5°E, allows the use in target countries of a single small dish fitted with a monoblock Duo LNB to receive channels from both positions.

Capacity and reach
 the Astra satellites at 19.2° east broadcast on 147 transponders (2 Ka-band and 145 Ku-band) to 118.4 million households (44.7 million via cable, 27.5 million via IPTV and 46.2 million direct to home satellite dishes).

History
Launched in 1988, Astra 1A was the first satellite in the Astra 19.2°E group. With 16 transponders, Astra 1A was the first satellite intended for DTH reception of satellite TV across Europe. From the start of transmissions in 1989, Astra 1A carried four channels for Sky Television, the world's first commercial multi-channel DTH service, on transponders leased before the satellite was completed.

Early channels broadcasting from 19.2°East included those primarily intended for the UK, Germany, the Benelux countries, and Scandinavia, and so-called pan-European channels such as MTV Europe, CNN International, and Eurosport.

Astra 1A was joined at 19.2°East by Astra 1B in 1991 and subsequently by Astra 1C in 1993, establishing SES' principles of co-locating satellites for the provision of transparent backup by each satellite for the others in the group.

The first three satellites at Astra 19.2°E carried only analogue channels in PAL and D2-MAC. The fourth satellite, Astra 1D launched in 1994, was originally intended to carry the first European digital TV channels but the rapid expansion of satellite television across Europe and demand for analogue TV capacity meant that it was primarily used for analogue signals.

Astra 1E (1995) was dedicated to digital satellite TV services for Europe and subsequent satellites launched to Astra 19.2°E were also all-digital in the traffic they carried.

Hand-in-hand with the switchover to digital transmission of TV by satellite came a shift to encryption and the targeting of channels to individual countries or regions. The demand for digital TV capacity was so great that SES opened up additional orbital positions to provide for new digital networks aimed at specific countries, starting with Astra 28.2°E for the UK and Ireland, in 1998. That became the home of Sky Digital, and the last Sky analogue channels left Astra 19.2°E in 2001.

Most Scandinavian broadcasters have migrated from Astra 19.2°E to 1°West and Astra 5°E, and SES has also opened orbital positions of  Astra 23.5°E and Astra 31.5°E to cope with the ever-increasing demands for digital capacity and the expanding markets of Eastern Europe, Africa and Asia that are now served by Astra satellites.

In November 2021, SES ordered two replacement satellites from Thales Alenia Space for launch to Astra 19.2°E in 2024 as Astra 1KR and Astra 1L reach the end of their planned life. Astra 1P will provide direct-to-home broadcast TV to Europe, in particular Germany, France and Spain. Astra 1Q is a reconfigurable software defined satellite with both wide beams for broadcast TV and high-throughput spot beams for video and data customers. Both new satellites should provide service well into the 2040s.

Channels

See also
 SES satellite operator
 Astra satellite family
 HD+
 Astra 28.2°E other SES orbital position
 Astra 23.5°E other SES orbital position
 Astra 5°E other SES orbital position
 Astra 31.5°E other SES orbital position
 Duo LNB

References

External links
 SES guide to channels broadcasting on Astra satellites 
 SES fleet information and map
 SES Astra website
  SES HDTV website
  HD+ website
 Videobitrates of 19.2°E channels - daily measured
 
 
 
 

Communications satellite orbital positions
SES S.A.